George Robert Marshman (September 24, 1936 – December 3, 1964), was an American racecar driver.

Born the son of auto race promoters George and Evelyn Marshman in Pottstown, Pennsylvania, Marshman died in San Antonio, Texas of injuries sustained in a tire test in Phoenix, Arizona.

He drove in the USAC Championship Car series, racing in the 1961-1964 seasons, with 49 career starts, including each Indianapolis 500 contest in that span. He finished in the top ten 25 times, with one victory, in 1962 at the Arizona State Fairgrounds in Phoenix. His 7th-place finish at the 1961 Indianapolis 500 earned him co-Rookie of the Year honors with Parnelli Jones.

Marshman may be best known for his performance during the 1964 Indianapolis 500. Early in the race, following a fiery crash that claimed the lives of Eddie Sachs and Dave MacDonald, Marshman took the lead from polesitter and race favorite Jim Clark. Marshman, driving a Lotus 29-Ford, extended his lead until the 37th lap, when he was forced off the track to avoid hitting a slower car driven by Johnny White. The instant he spent off the track tore loose oil and water lines, and retired the car. Many observers felt Marshman was on his way to a comfortable victory before luck intervened. A story from the time holds that Marshman wandered the crowd for an hour before returning to the pits and his crew. Marshman, dressed in his fireproof overalls and with oily goggle-marks around his eyes, was holding a race program. Jack Beckley, Marshman's crew chief, studied him quizzically and finally asked, "what are you doing with that?" An embarrassed and crestfallen Marshman replied, "I thought if I bought it no one would know I was a driver and they wouldn't ask me silly questions."

On November 27, 1964, Marshman was conducting tire tests at the Phoenix 1-mile paved oval. When his Lotus-Ford crashed into the west retaining wall and ruptured the fuel tank, he was not wearing fire-retardant clothing to protect him according to some reports. First able to leave the wreck unassisted, Marshman succumbed to his second and third degree burns six days later.

About a year after her husband's death, Marshman's widow, Janet F. Marshman, sued Ford Motor Company for $5 million, claiming that the crash resulted from negligence by the car owner, purported to be Ford, which also failed to comply with a warranty that the car was safe according to the suit.

The first Bobby Marshman Memorial race, which featured ARDC midget cars and was promoted by George Marshman, was held at Hatfield Speedway in June 1966.

Complete USAC Championship Car results

Indianapolis 500 results

References

External links

1936 births
1964 deaths
People from Pottstown, Pennsylvania
Racing drivers from Pennsylvania
Indianapolis 500 drivers
Indianapolis 500 Rookies of the Year
Racing drivers who died while racing
Sports deaths in Arizona
USAC Stock Car drivers